A parietal eye, also known as a third eye or pineal eye, is a part of the epithalamus present in some vertebrates. The eye is located at the top of the head, is photoreceptive and is associated with the pineal gland, regulating circadian rhythmicity and hormone production for thermoregulation. The hole in the head which contains the eye is known as a pineal foramen or parietal foramen, since it is often enclosed by the parietal bones.

Presence in various animals
The parietal eye is found in the tuatara, most lizards, frogs, salamanders, certain bony fish, sharks, and lampreys. It is absent in mammals, but was present in their closest extinct relatives, the therapsids, suggesting it was lost during the course of the mammalian evolution due to it being useless in endothermic animals. It is also absent in the ancestrally endothermic ("warm-blooded") archosaurs such as birds. The parietal eye is also lost in ectothermic ("cold-blooded") archosaurs like crocodilians, and in turtles, which may be grouped with archosaurs in Archelosauria. Despite being lepidosaurs, as lizards and tuatara are, snakes lack a parietal eye.

Anatomy
The third eye, where present, is always much smaller than the main paired eyes, and, in living species, it is always covered by skin, and is usually not readily visible externally.

The parietal eye is a part of the epithalamus, which can be divided into two major parts; the epiphysis (the pineal organ, or pineal gland if mostly endocrine) and the parapineal organ (often called the parietal eye, or if it is photoreceptive, the third eye). These structures arise as a single anterior evagination of the pineal organ or as a separate outgrowth of the roof of the diencephalon, but during development it divides into two more or less bilaterally symmetric organs which rotate their location to become a caudal pineal organ and a parapineal organ. In some species, it protrudes through the skull. The parietal eye uses a different biochemical method  of detecting light from that of rod cells or cone cells in a normal vertebrate eye.

Many of the oldest fossil vertebrates, including ostracoderms, placoderms, crossopterygians, and even early tetrapods, had a socket in the skull that appears to have held a functional third eye. This socket remains as a foramen between the parietal bones even in many living amphibians and reptiles, although it has vanished in birds and mammals. 

Lampreys have two parietal eyes, one that developed from the parapineal organ and the other from the pineal organ. These are one behind the other in the centre of the upper surface of the braincase. Because lampreys are among the most primitive of all living vertebrates, it is possible that this was the original condition among vertebrates, and may have allowed bottom-dwelling species to sense threats from above.

Saniwa, an extinct varanid lizard, probably had two parietal eyes, one that developed from the pineal organ and the other from the parapineal organ. Saniwa is the only known jawed vertebrate to have both a pineal and a parapineal eye. In most vertebrates, the pineal organ forms the parietal eye, however, in lepidosaurs, it is formed from the parapineal organ, which suggests that Saniwa re-evolved the pineal eye.

Comparative anatomy
The parietal eye of amphibians and reptiles appears relatively far forward in the skull; thus it may be surprising that the human pineal gland appears far away from this position, tucked away between the corpus callosum and cerebellum.  Also the parietal bones, in humans, make up a portion of the rear of the skull, far from the eyes.  To understand this, note that the parietal bones formed a part of the skull lying between the eyes in sarcopterygians and basal amphibians, but have moved further back in higher vertebrates.  Likewise, in the brain of the frog, the diencephalon, from which the pineal stalk arises, appears relatively further forward, as the cerebral hemispheres are smaller but the optic lobes are far more prominent than the human mesencephalon, which is part of the brain stem.  In humans the optic tract, commissure, and optic nerve bridge the substantial distance between eyes and diencephalon.  Likewise the pineal stalk of Petromyzon elongates very considerably during metamorphosis.

Analogs in other species
Crustaceans have a single eye atop the head as a nauplius (first-stage larva). The eye has a lens and senses the direction of light but cannot resolve more details in images. Later, more sophisticated segmented eyes develop on sides of the head while the initial eye stays for some time. So, it is possible to say that, at some stage of development, crustaceans also have a "third eye". Some species, like the brine shrimp, retain the primary eye, being three-eyed in the adult stage. Most arthropods have simple eyes, called ocelli, between their main, compound eyes.

See also
Third eye
Arthropod eye
Mollusc eye
Simple eye in invertebrates
Vision in fish

References

Lizards
Endocrine system
Sensory organs in animals
Eye